Geberit-Arena is a multi-use stadium in Pfullendorf, Germany.  It is currently used mostly for football matches and is the home stadium of SC Pfullendorf. The stadium is able to hold 10,000 people and opened in 1955.

References

Football venues in Germany
Buildings and structures in Sigmaringen (district)
Sports venues in Baden-Württemberg
Sport in Tübingen (region)